The 2021 Pocono Organics CBD 325 was a NASCAR Cup Series race that was held on June 26, 2021, at Pocono Raceway in Long Pond, Pennsylvania. Contested over 130 laps on the  triangular racecourse, it was the 18th race of the 2021 NASCAR Cup Series season.

Entry list 
 (R) denotes rookie driver.
 (i) denotes driver who are ineligible for series driver points.

Qualifying
Kyle Larson was awarded the pole for the race as determined by competition-based formula.

Starting Lineup

Race

Stage Results

Stage One
Laps: 25

Stage Two
Laps: 52

Final Stage Results

Stage Three
Laps: 53

On the final lap, Kyle Larson, who had passed Alex Bowman for the lead with four laps to go, cut a left front tire entering the final corner at turn three and would hit the wall. Bowman would go on to take the victory from Kyle Busch, who led the most laps, William Byron, Denny Hamlin and Ryan Blaney. Larson was credited with a ninth place finish, crossing the line with a badly damaged car.

Race statistics
 Lead changes: 14 among 9 different drivers
 Cautions/Laps: 8 for 25
 Red flags: 0
 Time of race: 2 hours, 30 minutes and 38 seconds
 Average speed:

Race recap 
For pre-race ceremonies, Monty Self of Motor Racing Outreach gave out the invocation. Ellen Kane would sing the national anthem. A singular USAF C-17 Globemaster III would perform a flyover at the end of the national anthem. Jeff Moyer, CEO of Rodale Institute, would give the starting command.

Kyle Larson would lead the first 5 laps before being passed by William Byron on lap 6. On lap 10, a caution was called for debris in Turn 2. On the restart, Byron would pull away but a lap later, Brad Keselowski, in an attempt to go under Cole Custer, hit Custer in the back and sent Custer into the outside wall, sending cars scattering as Custer slid down into the inside wall. Custer would retire from the race. After pit stops, Kyle Busch would assume the lead. Kyle Busch would pull away from William Byron on the restart and go on to win Stage 1.

On the final lap, Larson would blow a tire on the final turn, hitting the Turn 3 wall. Bowman, who was second at the time would pass Larson and win the race. Larson would eventually crawl to the line, finishing ninth.

Media

Television
NBC Sports covered the race on the television side. Rick Allen, Jeff Burton, Steve Letarte and Dale Earnhardt Jr. called the race from the broadcast booth. Dave Burns, Marty Snider and Kelli Stavast handled the pit road duties from pit lane. Jac Collinsworth handled the features from the track.

Radio
MRN had the radio call for the race which was also simulcast on Sirius XM NASCAR Radio. Alex Hayden and Jeff Striegle called the race in the booth when the field raced through the tri-oval. Dave Moody called the race from the Sunoco spotters stand outside turn 2 when the field raced through turns 1 and 2. Mike Bagley called the race from a platform inside the backstretch when the field raced down the backstretch. Kyle Rickey called the race from the Sunoco spotters stand outside turn 3 when the field raced through turn 3. Steve Post and Kim Coon worked pit road for the radio side.

Standings after the race

Drivers' Championship standings

Manufacturers' Championship standings

Note: Only the first 16 positions are included for the driver standings.
. – Driver has clinched a position in the NASCAR Cup Series playoffs.

References

Pocono Organics CBD 325
Pocono Organics CBD 325
Pocono Organics CBD 325
NASCAR races at Pocono Raceway